Griffing Park is an area of Port Arthur, Texas, United States that used to be a separate city in Jefferson County.

In 1929 Port Arthur began its attempts to annex Griffing Park, which incorporated on November 13 of that year. In 1983 Port Arthur annexed Griffing Park. The proposed annexations were blocked by injunctions; the first was removed on November 26, 1929, and the second began in May 1930. Handbook of Texas describes the town's attitude during the 1983 merging process with Port Arthur as "kicking and screaming."

Education
Griffing Park is within the Port Arthur Independent School District.

References

Further reading
 "Consolidation put into operation." Port Arthur News. February 1, 1983.
 "Goodbye to Gritting Park."
 "Consolidation official, marks ‘step forward’."

External links

Port Arthur, Texas
Former cities in Texas
Geography of Jefferson County, Texas
Populated places disestablished in 1983